The eight-thousanders are the 14 mountains that rise more than  above sea level; they are all in the Himalayan and Karakoram mountain ranges.

This is a list of mountaineers who have died on these mountains.

Mount Everest 

Mount Everest, Earth's highest mountain, has been host to numerous tragedies; over 300 have died on the mountain, with deaths occurring every year since 1978, excluding 2020 when permits were not issued due to the COVID-19 pandemic. The most notable events occurred during the 1922 British Mount Everest Expedition, 1970 Everest Disaster, 1974 Everest Disaster, 1996 Everest Disaster, 2014 Mount Everest avalanche, and 2015 Mount Everest avalanches.

K2 
K2 is the world's second highest mountain. While its summit is at a lower altitude than the summit of Mount Everest, it is considered to be a much harder mountain to climb, due to its steep faces, and extreme weather. As of February 2021, 377 people have completed a summit of the mountain, while 91 have died trying, a staggering 4:1 ratio.

Kangchenjunga 
Kangchenjunga is the third highest mountain in the world.

Lhotse 
Lhotse is the fourth highest mountain in the world.

Makalu 
Makalu is the world's fifth highest mountain.

Cho Oyu 
Cho Oyu is the world's sixth highest mountain.

Dhaulagiri I 
Dhaulagiri I is the world's seventh highest mountain.

Manaslu 
Manaslu is the world's eighth highest mountain.

Nanga Parbat 
Nanga Parbat is the world's ninth highest mountain.

Annapurna I 
Annapurna I is the world's 10th highest mountain.

Gasherbrum I 
Gasherbrum I, also known as Hidden Peak or K5, is the world's 11th highest mountain.

Broad Peak 
Broad Peak is the world's 12th highest mountain.

Gasherbrum II 
Gasherbrum II, also known as K4, is the world's 13th highest mountain.

Shishapangma 
Shishapangma, also called Gosainthān, is the world's 14th highest mountain.

Deaths per mountain

See also 
 The Himalayan Database
 List of Mount Everest death statistics
 List of people who died climbing Mount Everest
 Lists of people by cause of death
 Mount Hood climbing accidents

Bibliography

References

Accidents
 
Climbing and mountaineering-related lists
Eight-thousanders
Mountaineering

Eight-Thousanders